Dulce Maria Cardoso (born 1964) is a Portuguese writer. Her family came back to Portugal in 1975 along with half a million other retornados as Portugal's overseas colonies gained independence.

She studied law at the University of Lisbon and worked as a lawyer before taking up writing on a full-time basis. Her fiction includes novels as well as short stories. Her debut novel Campo de Sangue (2002) won the Grand Prize "Acontece de Romance". Os Meus Sentimentos won the EU Prize for Literature, and O Chão dos Pardais (2009) won the Portuguese Pen Club Award. Her fourth novel O Retorno (2011) was also published to wide acclaim.

Works 
 Campo de Sangue; novel; Ed. Asa 2002
 Os meus Sentimentos; novel; Ed. Asa 2005
 Até Nós; short stories; Ed. Asa 2008
 O Chão dos Pardais; novel; Ed. Asa 2009
 O Retorno; novel; Ed. Tinta da China 2011. El retorno, novela. Ed. La Umbría y la Solana, 2018
 A Bíblia de Lôá (children's literature),  Ed. Tinta da China, 2014 - split in 2 volumes: Lôá e a véspera do primeiro dia and Lôá perdida no paraíso 
 Tudo são histórias de amor (short stories), Ed. Tinta da China, 2014
 Eliete - A Vida Normal, Ed. Tinta da China, 2018

Awards
 Her first work "Campo de Sangue" was distinguished in 2002 with the award Grande Prémio Acontece de Romance
 For her first romance "Os meus Sentimentos" she received in 2009 the award "Prémio da União Europeia para a Literatura"
 "Chão dos Pardais" was distinguished with the award "Prémio Pen Club Português" in 2010 and also that same year the award "Prémio Ciranda"

References

1964 births
Portuguese women novelists
Living people